The 2014 FC Kairat season was the 4th successive season that the club playing in the Kazakhstan Premier League, the highest tier of association football in Kazakhstan, since their promotion back to the top flight in 2009. Kairat finished the season in 3rd place, winning the Kazakhstan Cup and reaching the Second qualifying round of the Europa League, being knocked out by Esbjerg.

Squad

Transfers

Winter

In:

 

Out:

Summer

In:

Out:

Competitions

Kazakhstan Premier League

First round

Results summary

Results by round

Results

League table

Championship Round

Results summary

Results by round

Results

Table

Kazakhstan Cup

UEFA Europa League

Qualifying rounds

Squad statistics

Appearances and goals

|-
|colspan="14"|Players away from Kairat on loan:
|-
|colspan="14"|Players who appeared for Kairat that left during the season:

|}

Goal scorers

Disciplinary record

References

External links
Official Site

Kairat
Kairat
FC Kairat seasons